This is the discography of English new wave/post-punk band Modern English.

Albums

Studio albums

Live albums

Compilation albums

EPs

Singles

References

Discographies of British artists
Rock music group discographies
New wave discographies